Voisine is a surname. Notable people with the surname include:

Don Voisine (born 1952), American painter
Roch Voisine (born 1963), Canadian singer-songwriter, actor, and radio and television host